Slabtown or Slab Town was a red-light district that developed in Atlanta in the 1840s. The neighborhood, which was the site of a railway terminus, was located off present-day Decatur Street. In the 20th, century Grady Memorial Hospital was developed at this site.

The area's structures were built by poor workers and settlers largely with slabs and leftover lumber from pioneer Jonathan Norcross's sawmill. As the railroad terminus grew, this area was associated with brothels, saloons, and gambling.

History 

Dubbed the "Father of Atlanta" and "hard fighter of everything," Jonathan Norcross was a pioneer in the railroad town. Born in 1808 and raised in Maine, along with his six siblings. 

Following Indian Removal in the 1830s, in 1844 Norcross moved to northern Georgia, where he became a successful dry goods merchant and sawmill operator. His sawmill produced mainly railroad ties and string timbers for the assembly of the Georgia Railroad, which had a terminus at Atlanta. Reclaiming timber and debris discarded by the sawmill, poor settlers quickly began building crude shanties for their families.

Rise and fall 
In 1845 pioneer life could be characterized as desolate and distinct with simple pleasures. The numerous male railroad workers in Atlanta sought rough trade. About 15 years before the American Civil War was a time of ill repute for Atlanta; the railroad town was known for vice and political corruption. A collection of huts, whorehouses, shacks, and saloons began developing in the settlement. 

Norcross commented, "the reason why the streets are so crooked, is that every man built on his land just to suit himself." He was elected as the fourth mayor of Atlanta.

Slabtown was considered a "wicked development" that offended "the good citizens of Atlanta, as crimes were often committed there, and many of the young men fell into bad habits from frequenting Slab Town. In these places, occurred scenes of debauchery and indecency that shocked the moral sense of the community."

Atlanta's leaders demonstrated the need for law and order by their hasty municipal decisions. In 1902 an informal militia in disguise, known as White Caps, attacked Slab Town by night. They whipped the men found in huts devoted to prostitution and other vices, and warned them to leave town. They burned down the shanties and the area was abandoned. The residents were displaced by force. As Atlanta developed in the 20th century, this area was redeveloped for what is now Grady Memorial Hospital.

21st-century art and Slabtown 
In early February 2010, Atlanta BeltLine, Inc. (ABI) and Atlanta's Office of Cultural Affairs developed a project Art on the BeltLine: Atlanta's New Public Place  as part of redevelopment of the former industrial areas around the city. They sequenced visual and performance art installations, as well as historic site interpretations, at different points along the Atlanta BeltLine to draw the public. A sculptural homage of the City's historic Slabtown was assembled by the contemporary art collective THE STATUS FACTION. Located on Irwin Street at the BeltLine, the Slab Town installation resembles the "slab-style residences" which were destroyed and abandoned in 1902.

Notes

References
 Garrett, Franklin, Atlanta and Its Environs, 1954, University of Georgia Press.
 Martin, Thomas H., Atlanta and Its Builders, 1902, Century Memorial Pub. Co.
 Pioneer Citizens' Society of Atlanta. Pioneer Citizens' History of Atlanta, 1833–1902. Atlanta: Byrd Printing Co., 1902.
 Carter, Samuel. The Siege of Atlanta, 1864. New York: St. Martin's Press, 1973, p. 40.
 "Atlanta Old and New: Prehistory to 1847"
 Atlanta BeltLine, official website

History of Atlanta
Former shantytowns and slums in Atlanta
Historical red-light districts in the United States